Sankt Egidien (Saint Egidien) is a municipality in the district of Zwickau in Saxony in Germany.

History
The town was named after Saint Giles, allegedly for missionary work done by him or his disciples to the Goths.

References 

Zwickau (district)